New Winchester is an unincorporated community in Whetstone Township, Crawford County, Ohio, United States.

History
New Winchester was laid out in 1835.

References

Populated places in Crawford County, Ohio